Landucci is an Italian surname. Notable people with the surname include:

Dominic Landucci, American aquanaut
Luca Landucci (1436–1516), Italian apothecary
Marco Landucci (born 1964), Italian footballer and coach

Surnames of Italian origin
Italian-language surnames